Robert Shmalo (born November 2, 1977, in Cincinnati) is an American former ice dancer who competed from 1997 to 2003 with Kimberly Navarro. With Navarro, Shmalo was an alternate for the 2002 Salt Lake City Olympics. Navarro / Shmalo were coached by Inese Bucevica and their choreographers included Natalia Bestemianova. Prior to Shmalo's ice dancing career, he was a medalist at the U.S. Championships in the compulsory figures event.
  
After retiring from skating, Shmalo turned to law and currently works as an attorney with the international law firm of Proskauer Rose LLP in New York City.

Competitive highlights
GP: Grand Prix

With Navarro

Compulsory figures

References

External links
 
 Website of Navarro and Shmalo

1977 births
Living people
Sportspeople from Cincinnati
American male ice dancers